Althaeus is a genus of pea and bean weevils in the beetle family Chrysomelidae. There are at least three described species in Althaeus.

Species
These three species belong to the genus Althaeus:
 Althaeus folkertsi Kingsolver in Kingsolver, Gibb & Pfaffenberger, 1989 (velvetleaf seed beetle)
 Althaeus hibisci (Olivier, 1795)
 Althaeus steneri Kingsolver in Kingsolver, Gibb & Pfaffenberger, 1989

References

Bruchinae
Articles created by Qbugbot
Chrysomelidae genera